Mickey Maguire and Mickey Milkovich are characters from the British Channel 4 comedy drama, Shameless, and its American remake on Showtime.

U.K. version
Mickey Maguire is a character from the British Channel 4 comedy drama, Shameless. Originally, he was just like the rest of the Maguire family. He was aggressive, violent and prone to violent outbursts. He is erratic and obsessively licks the side of his mouth, which could be a tic and/or hint of a behavioral disorder. However, Mickey is a closeted homosexual, something which has become a running gag in later seasons. Mickey slowly matured as the show progresses, becoming less violent and aggressive and more kinder to people, something which results to mockery by the rest of his family. Despite his exaggerated personality, he is mentally weak due to being closeted and often runs away at the first sign of trouble. Although his father Paddy Maguire (Sean Gilder) often shows him disrespect and is violent towards him, Paddy still loves his son. Mickey is the most idealistic of his family, and the most loyal to his parents. In spite of Paddy's lack of faith in him, Mickey was the only person who tracked down Paddy after he was shot and left for dead. Mickey appeared in 84 episodes in total.

Character biography
When Mickey initiates a brief and casual affair with Ian Gallagher (Cameron Monaghan) and falls in love with him, Mickey exhibits the fact that he is an eager suitor when he follows Ian around and is very emotionally demanding. Unlike Ian, none of Mickey's family are aware of his homosexuality, despite several occasions when Mickey has come close to coming out to them, or has daydreams about revealing his homosexuality to his family. In his early appearances, Mickey has a dog, Nelson, whom he's been close to for years. Ian is disgusted to learn just how close they had become at one time, and declines to continue a relationship with Mickey. By this time, Mickey is in love with Ian and wants everyone to know. When Mickey is about to tell his family, Ian bursts into the room and tells them about what had happened with Mickey and Nelson. Paddy immediately has Nelson put down, deeply upsetting Mickey. After that, Mickey becomes obsessed with Ian, much to Ian’s dismay who constantly tries to avoid Mickey’s constant advances.

The early episodes of the sixth series show Mickey attending college to study film. When he reveals to his parents that he wants to pursue further education, Paddy and Mimi (Tina Malone) ridicule him. Later on in the series, Mimi accepts the fact that Mickey is going to college and supports her son in his educational endeavours. Unfortunately, Mickey struggles with the course and is distracted by an erotic story his professor accidentally slips in with his coursework. Mickey decides that his true talents are in erotic writing and gives up his place in the class for his mother, Mimi, who loves films and has always wanted to go to college.

In the seventh series, Mickey continues to build a friendship with Ian, with whom he now shares a house. This series has proved that Mickey has a sensitive side, as explained through his dialogue with Ian when Ian became involved with Maxine Donnelly (Joanna Higson). Mickey tries to warn Ian that Maxine fancies him, not realising that Ian felt the same way about Maxine. Ian then has sex with Mickey in an attempt to forget about Maxine, but he and Maxine later have sex, which Mickey witnesses. Mickey is devastated when Ian insists he loves Maxine and wants to be with her. Mickey tells Ian that he felt like a freak before he had Ian to look up to, and now Ian has taken that away from him. Relations between Mickey and the new couple remain strained, but eventually Mickey decides to stop letting their relationship bother him. He informs Maxine that all he wants is that when she finally realises she cannot be happy with a gay man, that she lets Ian down gently. Mickey leaves Chatsworth during ninth series after helping a young woman, Liz, give birth to a baby girl. After Liz dies in childbirth, Mickey decides to move away from Chatsworth to raise the baby, whom Liz named Jasmine before she died. When saying goodbye to Mimi, he is on the verge of telling her he is gay. However, she silences him and tells him to keep in contact. Mimi implies that she has guessed Mickey is gay.

The actor who plays Mickey, Ciarán Griffiths, announced that he would leave Shameless in 2012 during Series 9.

U.S. version
In the American remake, also called Shameless, Mickey Maguire is renamed Mickey Milkovich. He is portrayed by Noel Fisher.

Character biography
When the actor is asked about Mickey's age, he answers "I don’t have an answer for you. It’s actually something that has been joked about on set for a little while now because no one seems to know! My idea is that he is a few years older than Ian. I wouldn’t think more than three though but again, I’m totally making this up".
The only reference in the show is in Season 3, where Mickey says that he's not going back to school because he'd still be a freshman due to not passing classes the previous year. However, the fact that he was explicitly stated to be in juvie at the time of his incarceration indicates that he has to be at most 17 when he is released from juvie for the last time (in Season 3).

In Season 1, Mickey's presented as the neighborhood thug, violent and homophobic, but as the series goes on it is revealed to the audience that he's secretly gay. This was seen when he initially fights Ian but they end up having sex. The pair begin a secret fling behind the back of Mandy and his father.

In the third season, Mickey is spending time with Ian after the rest of the Gallagher children are taken away by child protective services, Mickey lets him stay at his house since his father Terry was away on an extended hunting trip. However, Terry ends up coming home early and catches Mickey and Ian having sex. He beats both of them, and forces Ian to watch Mickey being raped by a prostitute. Afterwards, Mickey goes to great lengths to avoid Ian. Eventually, Mickey marries the prostitute Svetlana but he and Ian have sex on Mickey's wedding day.

In Season 4, Mickey and his wife are expecting child but Mickey is hardly attentive to her. He later finds Ian passed out at another bar, Fairy Tails, and brings him to the Milkovich home. After Mickey's wife Svetlana threatens him, Ian moves back home. Mickey and Ian launch a criminal enterprise, robbing closeted gay men and threaten to out them if they report the crime. Mickey goes to his son's christening and declines Ian's offer to go, Ian criticizing him for his closeted nature. At the after party, Terry arrives after his release. Ian threatens to end his relationship with Mickey over Mickey’s fear of coming out. Not wanting to lose him, Mickey comes out as gay to the entirety of the bar, including Terry. Mickey and Terry get into a fist fight, Ian unsuccessfully attempting to intervene, until the police are called. Terry is sent back to jail for violating probation, while Mickey is released by a sympathetic gay officer. As a result, Mickey and Ian are free to continue their relationship. Following his manic behavior throughout the season, Mickey finds Ian laid up in bed in a deep depression, so he calls the Gallaghers who worry that he has inherited Monica's bipolar disorder.

In Season 5, Mickey has gotten a job and is now trying to move from his past thug behavior. He has taken to becoming more involved in his son's life and helping Svetlana taking care of them with them being on better terms. After Ian's behavior spirals, Mickey insists that he can take care of him, but Ian runs away with Mickey and Svetlana's baby, leading to his arrest and ultimately being voluntarily committed. Later that night, Mickey watches Ian being arrested by the military police, which was called by Sammi (Frank's oldest daughter). When Ian returns home, Mickey is happy but Ian decides to break up with Mickey who is promptly chased by Sammi who wants to kill him as revenge.

During Season 6, Mickey is in prison for his attempted murder of Sammi. He is visited by his son and Ian who falsely promises to wait for him.

In Season 7, he breaks out of prison and comes back into Ian's life. Mickey persuades Ian to flee the country with and Ian agrees. However, Ian backs out and Mickey escapes into Mexico.

During Season 9, after Ian is sent to two years in prison, he finds that Mickey is his new cellmate. Mickey explains to the latter that he worked as informant for the feds in exchange for picking where he gets locked up. The reunited lovers resume their relationship.

Season 10 opens with both Mickey and Ian still in jail. Having been together for nearly a year and spending all their time together both men are beginning to get on each other's nerves. Things aren't much better, when Ian is given parole but Mickey will remain in prison. Despite that, Mickey comes to terms with it stops Ian from sabotaging his parole hearing and smuggles in a phone so that Ian can talk to his new nephew,Fred. This shows love they feel for each other is stronger as both try to perform grand gestures toward each other to prove their devotion to one another. Mickey later attempts to escape prison but is caught by the guards. However the warden informed him that he was scheduled for early release day anyway because of his cooperation. Unfortunately, Mickey becomes paranoid to hear the gang he snitched on will likely come for him.  This paranoia causes Mickey to initially mistake his parole officer and some of the new occupants of the Gallagher house for the gang. Despite that he is reunited with Ian and moves into the Gallagher house. Mickey and Ian reach a rough patch when Ian's corrupt parole officer becomes Mickey's, and is soon dead with both thinking the other did it but it turns out they were innocent. The two subsequently break up after Ian's cold feet about getting married and Mickey begins dating someone new, Byron. Ian later admits that he has insecurities about how Mickey could love and want to be with him with all of Ian's issues when Mickey could potentially find someone better.
In "Now Leaving Illinois," things between Ian and Mickey are strained with Mickey having a new boyfriend, Byron. However, after Ian overhears Byron bad-mouthing all of the qualities about Mickey that Ian loves, Ian beats him up. Ian proposes to Mickey on the spot who interrupts his speech and they get engaged.
In "Gallavich!," Ian and Mickey attempt to get married, only to have Terry burn down their wedding venue. Mickey is left homicidally angry and literally has to be handcuffed to be stopped from murdering Terry. Ian's friends and family come together to plan a new ceremony on short notice at a polka hall owned by an old flame of Frank's. Though Terry again tries to interrupt, Ian's former Gay Jesus followers step in to keep Terry from succeeding. Ian and Mickey are married and drive off to their honeymoon in a Mercedes owned by Frank's ex Faye. However, Terry shoots up their honeymoon suite, still angry over the wedding, though neither Ian or Mickey are hurt.

References

Television characters introduced in 2007
Fictional gay males
Fictional gangsters
Fictional drug dealers
Fictional con artists
Male characters in television
Fictional LGBT characters in television